Fair Warning is a 2020 thriller written by American author Michael Connelly. It is the third novel featuring Jack McEvoy, a Los Angeles investigative reporter for the consumer watchdog news service Fair Warning, as well as former FBI agent Rachel Walling. The novel is a sequel to the events in Connelly's 2009 book The Scarecrow. Themes explored in the book include the decline of investigative journalism and the print-newspaper, the rise of fake news, the misogynistic incel movement, and the dangers of trafficking in DNA sequence data by an industry having no government oversight or regulations.

The story is told in first-person narrative from the perspective of McEvoy, however, it occasionally swaps to third-person when following antagonists Marshall Hammond and The Shrike. Two chapters are stylized as news articles.

McEvoy's employer and its editor Myron Levin are both based on the real-life news service FairWarning with Myron Levin as its editor. FairWarning dissolved in February 2021.

Plot summary 
A drunk woman drives home with an unknown man. They go up to her apartment and have sex, before he puts her in a headlock and squeezes her neck. As she begins to lose consciousness, he tells her people call him "The Shrike".

Upon arriving at his apartment in the following days, reporter Jack McEvoy, now writing for the consumer watchdog news service FairWarning out of Los Angeles, is stopped by two L.A.P.D. detectives. They inform him that a woman he had a one-night stand with several months ago, Tina Portrero, was found dead in her shower, and that she had suffered atlanto-occipital-dislocation in what they believe was staged to look like an accident. The detectives leave after interrogating Jack and taking a DNA sample.

Reflecting on his history with Tina, Jack decides to investigate further. He leaves a post in a forum for coroners asking for any examples of recent AOD deaths. He looks into the few examples he finds and discovers that all of them submitted samples of their DNA to an ancestry website called GT23. Unsure of where to look next, Jack reconnects with former FBI agent Rachel Walling. She suggests the possibility of sex addiction being a common trait in the victims and joins Jack on the investigation.

Jack finds out that GT23 has a history of selling DNA samples to a company called Orange Nano and prepares an interview a board member of the company, William Orton, a former professor who was accused of raping one of his students until the DNA left on her body came up with no match. Before he can leave, he is arrested outside of his apartment by the detectives for obstruction.

A lab technician named Marshall Hammond works in a laboratory. He receives a text and finds Jack's name in the police system. Concerned, he and his partner Roger Vogel watch Jack in court until he is freed and returns to his investigation. Jack takes a fellow writer at FairWarning, Emily Atwater, onto the case. She finds Marshall Hammond's side DNA analysis business and informs Jack that he exclusively buys female DNA from Orange Nano. In the morning, a masked man breaks into Hammond's home and steals multiple profiles of women with the DRD4 gene. When Hammond returns home, the intruder introduces himself as The Shrike. He questions him on his operation, and then twists his neck until it breaks, similar to how a shrike executes its prey, before staging it as a suicide. 

Jack goes straight to Hammond's house with Rachel to find him hanging. Before calling the police, they print copies of the women's profiles and conceal it in Jack's car. With their editor Myron Levin, Jack and Emily deduce that Hammond was running an illicit website where he sold the information of women with the DRD4 gene to incels who intended to take advantage of them, and that a user on the sight, The Shrike, was instead murdering them. They begin the search for Hammond's partner and share some of their findings with the FBI. 

The Shrike murders a man after falsely identifying him as Vogel, breaking his neck and throwing him off a parking garage.  After receiving Vogel's identity from the FBI, Emily, Rachel, and Jack go to meet him at work. Vogel admits that he knows how to find The Shrike, but is abruptly ran over in the road and killed by The Shrike himself, who escapes before the FBI can interfere. He later destroys all evidence and escapes Los Angeles.

Months later, the case has been made public and the staff of FairWarning have published novels and hosted podcasts on the case. When Jack meets Rachel in a bar, she points out that a man in the corner has been staring at her all night. They report this to the FBI and send them a picture. They concoct a plan to bait the man out and trap him. They block the man in his car and shoot him after he pulls out a gun. He is only suspected of being a supporter of The Shrike looking to kill Rachel.

After another few months, as Jack is leaving a podcast recording, he nearly gets into a car accident and feels movement in the back of his car. Realizing that The Shrike is in his car, he texts Rachel to warn her. They set up a plan for him to drive off a highway and into a trap so that they can capture The Shrike, though, on his way there, he is caught in a traffic jam. When The Shrike reveals himself, he steps on the gas and veers down the shoulder and around the traffic. The Shrike wraps his arm around Jack's neck. Knowing that he will kill more innocents if he escapes, Jack swerves, flipping the car at a high speed. As it tumbles several times, The Shrike is thrown from the window and is crushed under the car. As bystanders rush to the crash, an injured Jack observes the scene. He later learns that The Shrike was never able to be identified. 

After Jack recovers, he visits Rachel at her place of work and proposes that she joins him on investigating crimes themselves, as he is disappointed with a lack of justice and can no longer simply report on them. She accepts.

Reception 
Barry Forshaw wrote in the Financial Times, "Connelly is an astute commentator on American society, notably the prevalence of fake news filtering from the highest political echelons down to every stratum of society." Critic Marilyn Stasio wrote in The New York Times, "Connelly is in terrific form here, applying genre conventions to the real-life dangers inherent in the commercial marketing of genetics research." Sandra Dallas wrote in the Denver Post that the novel "sheds light on the murky billion-dollar world of DNA testing.... [which has] little in the way of oversight or enforcement. Labs are licensed but essentially operate on their own. All that makes the subject ripe for a good mystery. And Michael Connelly is just the guy to write it."

References 

2020 American novels
English-language books
Novels about journalists
Novels by Michael Connelly
Novels set in Los Angeles
Little, Brown and Company books